Deer Park Airport was an airport in Deer Park in the Town of Babylon, on Long Island, in New York, United States.

Description 
Deer Park Airport opened in 1946, after approval was granted by the Town of Babylon.

The airport closed in 1974, after operating for nearly 3 decades. After closing, the land was sold and redeveloped.

Incidents and accidents 

 May 11, 1946: A Grumman Widgeon, piloted by M.L. Pruyn of Great Neck, New York, missed the runway at the airport by approximately 800 yards after experiencing an engine failure over the Long Island Sound during a return flight from Massachusetts; the aircraft made an emergency landing on a field at a farm near the airport. There were no injuries.
 October 20, 1956: Two small planes collided, injuring a 26-year-old student pilot from nearby Massapequa Park.

See also 

 Zahn's Airport – Another former airport on Long Island, located in nearby North Amityville.

References 

Defunct airports in New York (state)
Airports in Suffolk County, New York
Babylon (town), New York